Janne Ritamäki (born August 13, 1986) is a Finnish ice hockey player. His is currently playing with Lahti Pelicans in the Finnish SM-liiga.

Ritamäki made his SM-liiga debut playing with Lahti Pelicans during the 2012–13 SM-liiga season.

Career statistics

References

External links

1986 births
Living people
Finnish ice hockey left wingers
Lahti Pelicans players
Mikkelin Jukurit players
Peliitat Heinola players
People from Heinola
Sportspeople from Päijät-Häme